Carole Franck (born 1970 in Paris) is a French actress.

Filmography

Dubbing

Theatre

References

External links

 
 

Living people
French film actresses
French television actresses
Actresses from Paris
20th-century French actresses
21st-century French actresses
French stage actresses
1970 births